Lie Back and Enjoy It is the second album by British-American blues rock group Juicy Lucy, which was released in 1970. Although several members of the band had been replaced since the release of their first album, most notably singer Ray Owen and lead guitarist Neil Hubbard, it was generally considered to be a respectable follow up to their eponymous debut album of the previous year. The bulk of the songs were written by the band, although the album does feature the addition of Willie Dixon's "Built for Comfort" and a cover of the Frank Zappa song "Willie the Pimp". The album cover has a photograph of steel guitarist Glenn Ross Campbell.

The album peaked at number 53 in the UK Albums Chart in November 1970.

Track listing

Side one
"Thinking of My Life" (Paul Williams) - 4:27
"Built for Comfort" (Willie Dixon) - 6:00
"Pretty Woman" (Paul Williams) - 3:12
"Whisky in My Jar" (Micky Moody, Keith Ellis, Paul Williams) - 4:00

Side two
"Hello L.A., Bye Bye Birmingham" (Mac Davis, Delaney Bramlett) - 4:15
"Changed My Mind" (Neil Hubbard, Glenn Ross Campbell) - 3:07
"That Woman's Got Something" (Glenn Ross Campbell, Paul Williams, Micky Moody) 2:53
"Willie the Pimp" (Frank Zappa) / "Lie Back and Enjoy It" (Paul Williams) - 7:08

Personnel
 Paul Williams - vocals, congas, piano
 Chris Mercer - saxophone, keyboards
 Mick Moody - guitars
 Glenn Ross Campbell - steel guitars, mandolin
 Keith Ellis - bass
 Rod Coombes - drums, percussion

References

External links
Allmusic
Vertigo Records original sleeve notes

1970 albums
Vertigo Records albums
Atco Records albums
Bronze Records albums
Repertoire Records albums
Juicy Lucy (band) albums
Albums produced by Gerry Bron